Dorcadion nivosum is a species of beetle in the family Cerambycidae. It was described by Suvorov in 1913.

See also 
 Dorcadion

References

nivosum
Beetles described in 1913